Ram Ratan Singh is an Indian politician and leader of Communist Party of India from Bihar and a Member of the Bihar Legislative Assembly. He belongs to Bihat village of Begusarai district and was born in a Bhumihar family. He is uncle of JNU leader Kanhaiya Kumar. He  won the Teghra Assembly constituency in the 2020 Bihar Legislative Assembly election.

References 

Year of birth missing (living people)
Living people
Indian politicians
Communist Party of India politicians from Bihar
Tilka Manjhi Bhagalpur University alumni